Pablo Pavón Vinales (born 27 August 1945) is a Mexican trade union leader and politician affiliated with the Institutional Revolutionary Party. He served as Deputy of the LV and LIX Legislature of the Mexican Congress representing Veracruz, as well as a local deputy in the Congress of Veracruz. He also served as municipal president of Minatitlán, Veracruz from 1982 to 1985 and 2001 to 2003.

References

1945 births
Living people
Politicians from Veracruz
Mexican trade unionists
Institutional Revolutionary Party politicians
20th-century Mexican politicians
21st-century Mexican politicians
People from Minatitlán, Veracruz
Members of the Congress of Veracruz
Municipal presidents in Veracruz
Deputies of the LIX Legislature of Mexico
Members of the Chamber of Deputies (Mexico) for Veracruz